Parliamentary elections were held in Nauru on 18 November 1995. A record 67 candidates contested the 18 seats. All candidates ran as independents. Following the election Lagumot Harris was elected President by the Parliament, defeating incumbent Bernard Dowiyogo, who had been accused of squandering millions of dollars of royalties from phosphate mining (the cornerstone of Nauru's economy), by ten votes to seven. Voter turnout was 79.9%.

Ruby Dediya, previously MP for Anetan/Ewa from 1986 to 1992, was returned to Parliament in the elections as its only female member.

Results

References

Nauru
1995 in Nauru
Elections in Nauru
Non-partisan elections
Election and referendum articles with incomplete results